Grady Independent School District is a public school district based in the community of Lenorah, Texas (USA). In addition to Lenorah, the district also serves the community of Tarzan. Grady ISD has one school that serves students in grades kindergarten through twelve.

In 2009, the school district was rated "exemplary" by the Texas Education Agency.

Special programs

Athletics
Grady High School plays six-man football.

References

External links
 

School districts in Martin County, Texas